Rúben Ribeiro may refer to:
Ruben Ribeiro (equestrian) (1911-1986), Brazilian equestrian
Rúben Ribeiro (footballer, born 1987), Portuguese footballer who plays as a midfielder
Rúben Ribeiro (footballer, born 1995), Portuguese footballer who plays as a leftback